Desire Of My Heart is the ninth overall album of gospel singer Vanessa Bell Armstrong. This album continued Armstrong's trend of largely performing traditional gospel songs although she has experienced success as a mainstream gospel artist. Desire features the backing of Pastor Marvin Winans and the Perfecting Praise Choir. An accompanying home video release of the concert was also made available on VHS shortly after the album's release.

Track listing 
 We Sing Glory (5:11)
 Free (6:56)
 You Alone Are Worthy (7:58)
 Desire Of My Heart (6:02)
 Never Alone (6:58)
 Grab Hold (4:18)
 Yes, He Loves Me (6:06)
 He Is Lord (6:11)
 Oil of God (10:20)
 Labor in Vain (3:56)
 The Classics: Nobody But Jesus/Real/Peace Be Still (Medley) (9:10)

External links 
 

Vanessa Bell Armstrong albums
1998 live albums
Music of Detroit